Maja Haderlap (born 8 March 1961 in Eisenkappel-Vellach (Carinthia) is a bilingual Slovenian-German Austrian writer, best known for her multiple-award-winning novel, Angel of Oblivion, about the Slovene ethnic minority's transgenerational trauma of being treated as 'homeland traitors' by the German-speaking Austrian neighbors, because they were the only ever-existing military resistance against National Socialism in Austria.

Life
Her grandmother who was sent to Ravensbrück concentration camp. At ten years old, Haderlap's father was tortured by the Nazis to disclose where his father, who joined Slovene Partisans, was hiding. Her father often wanted to kill himself because of the way Austrian majority treated him. The family waited until he passed out, then pried his fingers from the gun. After reading her grandmother’s diary, she was “afraid of being overrun by the past, of being crushed by its weight.” She made a conscious decision to write about her family’s history in a novel.

Work
She holds a PhD in Theatre Studies from University of Vienna and has worked at the Alpen-Adria-Universität in Klagenfurt. She was editor for many years of the Carinthian Slovene minority literary magazine 'Mladje' and wrote poetry, prose, and essays in both Slovenian and German. Her work has been published in numerous German and international literary journals and anthologies. From 1992 to 2007, she worked as drama supervisor at the Klagenfurt City Theatre. She is the most awarded member of the Graz's Guild of writers and lives in Klagenfurt.

Angel of Oblivion

Winning one of the most important awards for literature in the German language, the Ingeborg Bachmann Prize in 2011, and the Max Frisch Prize of the City of Zurich in 2018, her most notable novel was made into a drama and put on theater stages. The story is told from a point of view of a young girl, growing up in the late-1960s or early-1970s in the Austrian province of Carinthia, learning to navigate the terrain between Slovenian, a language of the past anti-Nazi resistance and present humiliation, and German, an escape from being treated as traitor by her German-speaking Austrian neighbors.

Books 
 Žalik pesmi, Poems (1983)
 Bajalice, Poems (1987)
 Poems - Pesmi - Poems (1989)
 Deček in sonce (The boy and the sun), zadruga Novi Matajur, Cividale and Klagenfurt, Carinthia, Založba Drava 2000 
 Between Politics and Culture
 The city of Klagenfurt Theatre from 1992 to 2007. The era Pflegerl Dietmar (2007)
 Engel des Vergessens (Angel of Oblivion), Wallstein, Göttingen, 2011

Awards 
 2018: Max Frisch Prize of the City of Zurich
 2017: PEN Translation Prize for Angel of Oblivion, translated by Tess Lewis in 2016
 2012: Honorary Doctor, University of Klagenfurt
 2012: Writer in residence in one world foundation in Sri Lanka
 2011: Ingeborg Bachmann Prize for the novel "Angel of Oblivion"
 2006/2007: Austrian State Scholarship for Literature
 2005: Women's Culture Prize for Literature in the province of Carinthia
 2004: Hubert Burda Prize as part of the Hermann-Lenz Prize
 1989: Award of Prešeren Foundation
 1983: Promotion Award of Carinthia

References

External links 
 Private Homepage von Maja Haderlap
 Kurzporträt und Text Im Kessel bei bachmannpreis.eu
”Translation” (Poem) translated by Tess Lewis published in Words Without Borders, February 2016.

1961 births
Living people
People from Völkermarkt District
21st-century Austrian novelists
Austrian women novelists
Austrian women poets
University of Vienna alumni
21st-century Austrian women writers